The Powerpuff Girls Movie is a 2002 American animated superhero film based on the Cartoon Network animated television series The Powerpuff Girls. It was co-written and directed by series' creator Craig McCracken (in his directorial debut), co-written by Charlie Bean, Lauren Faust, Paul Rudish, and Don Shank, and stars the regular television cast of Cathy Cavadini, Tara Strong, E. G. Daily, Roger L. Jackson, Tom Kane, Tom Kenny, and Jennifer Hale. The film serves as a prequel to the series, and tells the origin story of how the Powerpuff Girls were created and came to be the defenders of Townsville and how Mojo Jojo became a supervillain.

Produced by Cartoon Network Studios as its first theatrical film, The Powerpuff Girls Movie premiered in Century City on June 22, 2002, and was released in theaters on July 3, 2002, by Warner Bros. Pictures.

Plot 
In the crime and injustice-riddled city of Townsville, Professor Utonium mixes sugar, spice and everything nice, hoping to produce the "perfect little girls" to improve Townsville. However, his laboratory assistant, the destructive chimpanzee Jojo, shoves him, causing him to accidentally break and spill a flask of Chemical X onto the concoction. The experiment succeeds, producing three little girls whom the Professor names Blossom, Bubbles, and Buttercup. He also discovers that the girls have gained superpowers from the added Chemical X. Despite the girls' recklessness with their powers, they all immediately grow to love each other as a family.

On their first day of school, the girls learn about the game of tag and begin to play it among themselves, which quickly grows destructive once they use their powers. The girls take their game downtown, where they accidentally cause damage to the city until the Professor calms them down. The next day, the citizens of Townsville treat the girls as outcasts due to their destructive behavior, and the Professor is arrested for creating the girls. Believing that using their powers again will only anger the townspeople more, the girls try to make their way home from school on foot, but they become lost in an alleyway, where the Gangreen Gang attacks them. Jojo, who has become superintelligent due to the Chemical X explosion mutating his brain, rescues the trio.

Planning control of the city and revenge on the Professor for replacing him with the girls, Jojo gains the girls' sympathy by convincing them that he is also hated for his powers and tricks them into helping him build a laboratory and machine powered by Chemical X, which he claims will earn them the public's affections. Afterward, Jojo rewards them with a trip to the local zoo, where he secretly implants small transportation devices on all the primates there. That night, Jojo brings the primates to his lab and uses his new machine to inject them with Chemical X, which turns them into evil mutants like himself. The next morning, after the Professor is released from prison, the girls show him all the "good" they have done, only to discover that the primates are attacking the city. Jojo, renaming himself as Mojo Jojo, publicly announces the girls assisted him, which damages their reputation further and makes the distraught Professor lose faith in them. Dejected, the girls exile themselves to an asteroid in outer space.

Mojo Jojo announces his intention to rule the planet, but becomes frustrated when his minions disobey him and concoct their own plans to terrorize Townsville. Overhearing the turmoil from space, the girls return to Earth and rescue the citizens, realizing they can use their powers to fight the primates. After his army is defeated, Mojo Jojo injects himself with Chemical X and grows into a giant monster, overpowering the girls in an intense battle. Rejecting Mojo Jojo's offer of an alliance to take over the world, the girls push him off a decrepit skyscraper just as the Professor arrives with an antidote for Chemical X to help the girls. Mojo Jojo lands on the Antidote X, which shrinks him down to his original size, battered and defeated.

The girls consider using the Antidote X to remove their powers, thinking they would be accepted as normal girls, but the people of Townsville protest against this, apologize for misjudging them, and their heroism is praised. Townsville's Mayor requests that the Professor authorize the trio to use their powers to defend Townsville, to which he and the girls agree, becoming the city's beloved crime-fighting superhero team "The Powerpuff Girls".

Voice cast

 Cathy Cavadini as Blossom
 Tara Strong as Bubbles
 E. G. Daily as Buttercup
 Roger L. Jackson as Mojo Jojo
 Tom Kane as Professor Utonium and Talking Dog
 Tom Kenny as the Mayor of Townsville, Narrator, Mitch Mitchelson, Snake, and Lil' Arturo
 Jennifer Hale as Ms. Sandy Keane
 Jennifer Martin as Ms. Sarah Bellum
 Jeff Bennett as Ace, Big Billy, and Grubber
 Grey DeLisle and Phil LaMarr as additional character voices
 Frank Welker as various evil primates
 Kevin Michael Richardson as Rocko Socko and Ojo Tango
 Dee Bradley Baker as Hotta Watta and Killa Drilla

Production
During the film's production, series creator and director Craig McCracken did not want it to appeal exclusively to girls, as the series' merchandise made it out to be, choosing to make an action-adventure film that felt closer to his conception of the Powerpuff Girls. When deciding what the final plot would be, the crew had "one that was purely an action show, and then one that was more of a subtle character piece"; Cartoon Network liked both of them, so the result is a hybrid. McCracken said that there was no real difference when directing the film in comparison to a standard TV episode:

The Powerpuff Girls was known for its audience being highly composed by "underground" adults, and the film adaptation was intended in part to appeal to that demographic, and according to Cartoon Network executives, "spark sales of DVDs and home videos, pack in crowds overseas and set kids scrambling to buy cartoon-themed merchandise", also calling the attention of more girls and teens. Jim Samples, executive vice president and general manager of the network, saw the year 2002 as a good opportunity to bring the show to the big screen, given the success of family features such as Disney's Lilo & Stitch and the live-action adaptation of Scooby-Doo. During production, McCracken was encouraged by Cartoon Network to make an edgier film; he recalled via Tumblr:

Like the series, the film's animation was provided by Rough Draft Korea, with additional digital compositing and effects by Mercury Filmworks and additional animation by Munich Animation Film. All work done overseas was then shipped to Los Angeles, where the main crew put every single shot together digitally at the recently opened Cartoon Network Studios. The film keeps the staple watch of the television series with minimal changes, with characters such as the Girls and the Professor having a mostly geometric look. The backgrounds are hand-drawn with some computer-generated enhancements. It also went on to have some minor edits in pacing for the final cut, but "nothing so disastrous that it affected the final film", according to McCracken. It was noted that promotion for the film was rather limited when compared to that of other animated films from the same year, such as Hey Arnold!: The Movie. However, McCracken said that Warner Bros. was putting $20 million into promoting the film. Some of the production process was also documented for the film's subsequent home video releases. According to McCracken, 49 half-hour episodes of the TV series had been made up to that point, but production on the show went on hiatus to focus on the making of the movie.

Music
The crew was against including pop songs or any musical numbers that would interfere "in the body of the story", in order to respect audience expectations. However, the end credits are accompanied by a punk rock version of the series' ending theme by Bis, as well as "Pray for the Girls" by Frank Black and "That's What Girls Do" by No Secrets. James L. Venable, who worked on the television series, composed the film's score, blending traditional orchestration with electronica. He had listened to "old monster movie scores" and acts such as the Chemical Brothers and Propellerheads for inspiration in developing the series' musical style, which was then poured into the movie. McCracken thought the band Gorillaz would be fitting to perform the film's ending credits song, considering that the plot was about "evil monkeys attacking Townsville" and that the band members are animated. Gorillaz creators Jamie Hewlett and Damon Albarn showed interest in composing the song, but their schedule made it impossible to accomplish.

Promotion and release
By February 2002, the film was already being promoted on Cartoon Network's official website, where details about the "Be an Artist" contest were available, prompting fans in the United States under the age of 18 to send their drawings in the hopes of having it appear in a scene from the movie. The main winner was Laura Krammer, a 13-year-old girl from Ligonier, Indiana. In Latin America, kids could enter a contest in which the first place winner could earn three tickets for the movie and a video camera. One of Delta Express' Boeing 737-200 planes featured a special aircraft with Powerpuff Girls-themed livery, and customers were given promotional items regarding the movie, including activity sheets, temporary tattoos and buttons.

Kids' WB aired four episodes of the television show to help promote the movie. Prior to the release of the film, Daisy Rock produced a heart-shaped, 3/4 scale, pink guitar featuring all three Powerpuff Girls, and another featuring Mojo Jojo in a "premium alder body" with a 24-3/4" scale. Both instruments had a limited release. Out of the one hundred, some were given to cable viewers during the Cartoon Cartoon Fridays primetime block on May 31, 2002. A few others were available on Cartoon Network's online store for a short period. Artists who participated in the first two Powerpuff Girls soundtracks also got their own copy. From July of that year, Jack in the Box restaurants offered six toys based on the movie as part of their kid's meal menu: Punching Buttercup, Kung-Fu Bubbles, Karate Kick Blossom, Mojo Jojo's Volcano Viewer, Bulging Brains Mojo Jojo, and Skyscraper Mo Mojo Jojo. In July 17, DC published the film's official comic adaptation, written by Amy Rogers and illustrated by Phil Moy.

A premiere screening was held by Warner Bros. in Century City, California on June 22, 2002, which a part of the film's cast and crew attended, as well as celebrities such as Melissa Gilbert, Danny Bonaduce, Christine Lahti, Harry Hamlin, and Lisa Renee Foiles. In the United States, the film was rated PG by the Motion Picture Association of America (MPAA) for "non-stop frenetic animated action". The film was released in theaters on July 3, 2002, accompanied by a G-rated Dexter's Laboratory short titled "Chicken Scratch", in which Dexter gets chickenpox and tries not to scratch to avoid turning into an actual chicken. In various other countries, the Tom and Jerry short "The Mansion Cat" was screened instead, in which Tom tries to kick Jerry out of his owner's mansion, and "Chicken Scratch" was aired as a regular episode of Dexter's Laboratory instead. The Powerpuff Girls Movie later made its television debut on Cartoon Network on May 23, 2003.

Home media
The film was released on Region 1 VHS and DVD on November 5, 2002. The DVD included extras such as deleted scenes, behind-the-scenes footage and audio commentaries. Despite being filmed in 1.85:1 aspect ratio, the DVD and VHS are in fullscreen only, much akin to that of the original series. The Region 2 DVD release presents the film in its original widescreen aspect ratio, but omits the audio commentary and bonus features, and is also in PAL format. As of 2023, the film has not been released on Blu-ray and digital.

Reception

Critical response

The site's critical consensus reads, "It plays like an extended episode, but The Powerpuff Girls Movie is still lots of fun." On Metacritic, the film has a weighted average score of 65 out of 100 based on 25 critics, indicating "generally favorable reviews". Audiences polled by CinemaScore gave the film an average grade of "B" on an A+ to F scale.

Bob Longino of the Atlanta Journal-Constitution praised the film, writing, "The intricate drawings emanate 1950s futuristic pizazz like a David Hockney scenescape. The inspired script is both sinfully cynical and aw-shucks sweet". He also called it "one of the few American creations that is both gleeful pop culture and exquisite high art." Nell Minow of Common Sense Media gave the film four stars out of five, saying that it "may be a treat for the fans of the show, but its non-stop excitement and sense of humor is going to win over just about anyone". Virginia Heffernan of The New York Times said that "the movie is cute [...] but its violent, snickering style is pure Americana", and that it evokes the "outlandish classic" look of McCracken's inspirations. Ben Nuckols wrote for Associated Press that the protagonists' big eyes were the "only remarkable thing", which he considered "a shame, because the girls are delightful and the movie is skillfully made". New Sunday Times praised the animation, particularly the sequence where the Powerpuff Girls play tag, and said that "there's a lot to like about this movie", calling it "a good first movie".

Jerry Beck wrote for Animation World Network that the film was "good looking [...] but suffered from story problems", whereas Christene Meyers from Billings Gazette thought that the story could have been told in a few minutes. Contrarily, IGN's KJB said that the movie did not "overstay its welcome" with its 70-minutes length run and gave it 4 out of 5 stars. Dan Via, writing for The Washington Post, said that "even with its flaws, The Powerpuff Girls Movie offers dramatic pacing, cleverness and charm that are hard to come by in the summertime multiplex", ranging from moments of "epic stillness to the crash-bang-kapow flash of the action sequences". Mariano Kairuz, from the Argentine newspaper Página/12, wrote: "It's one of the happily bizarre cartoon movies to hit theaters in quite some time. One might even wonder how Cartoon Network and Warner authorized the multi-million dollar budget for something that looks and feels somewhat uncommercial". Marc Savlov of The Austin Chronicle gave the film 3 and a half stars out of 5, describing it as "retro fun that contains a serious self-empowerment message for little girls and little boys alike", as well as "brilliant, wacky, and utterly charming fluff". In a review for the newspaper Riverfront Times, Gregory Weinkauf said that the film's exploration of the girls' emotions during the asteroid scene was "a brilliant sequence" before the "blaze of chaotic action" in the third act. However, he was critical about the film's "bizarre anal sensibilities" (e.g. "cheeky shots of monkey butts — electroshocks slithering up into them [and] turd-bombs plopping out of them") and what he deemed as a "psychosexual fodder" of the Mayor having a "pickle fetish" and Sara Bellum's "voluptuous curves [that] fill the frame but whose actual head and identity as a mature woman are curiously omitted." In early 2003, the Online Film Critics Society released its list of the Top 100 Animated Features of All Time, where The Powerpuff Girls Movie was placed at number 86. In 2019, Paste magazine ranked the film number 72 on its list of the 100 best superhero movies of all time.

The film also received some mild criticism for its violence, which some felt was too extreme for a family-oriented film, especially in the wake of the 9/11 attacks the previous year.
In the 2009 documentary The Powerpuff Girls: Who, What Where, How, Why... Who Cares?, McCracken said, "In hindsight, maybe I wish it was a little sillier, a little more lighter, a little more... not so heavy the whole time." In 2016, he stated that due to the politics of the film's production, he would stick to the television industry instead of branching out into movies.

Box office 

The Powerpuff Girls Movie premiered in theaters in the United States on July 3, 2002. Because of the popularity of the TV show, some analysts predicted it would gross $15 million over the Fourth of July weekend. However, Mekeisha Madden from The News Tribune noted that the movie was facing a strong competition against films like Men in Black II and Lilo & Stitch: "The real question, according to some fans and industry experts, is if the movie is still timely. While the show is still hot with younger kids, The Powerpuff Girls reached its height in popularity with people over 14 in the summer of 2000". The movie only earned $6.1 million over its first five days of release, ranking ninth at the North American box office due to competition with Men in Black II. Brandon Gray, a Box Office Mojo editor, asserted that "it didn't help that at many of the venues the picture didn't have evening showings, alienating many of the TV show's older fans". By July 26, the film had dropped to #34 on the U.S. box office ranking. Ultimately, it grossed $11.4 million domestically and $5 million overseas for a worldwide total of $16.4 million with a $11 million budget. Mike Lazzo (former senior vice president of Cartoon Network's Adult Swim) said that the movie flopped abysmally due to a bad combination of "business"—as for when and how it was released—and "creative" (with it being "just good" instead of "genius"). Screen Rant listed the movie as one of the 25 lowest-grossing films at the global box office.

See also 

 List of films based on Hanna-Barbera cartoons
The Powerpuff Girls

References

External links 

 
 
 
 

2002 films
2000s English-language films
The Powerpuff Girls mass media
2002 animated films
2002 comedy films
2002 directorial debut films
2000s action comedy films
2000s female buddy films
2002 science fiction action films
2000s science fiction comedy films
2000s children's comedy films
2000s American animated films
2000s animated superhero films
2000s children's animated films
American female buddy films
American children's animated comic science fiction films
American children's animated superhero films
American children's animated adventure films
American science fiction action films
American action comedy films
Animated buddy films
Animated films about apes
Animated films about animals
Animated films about sisters
Animated films based on animated series
Animated superhero comedy films
Animated superheroine films
Animated films about children
Films about size change
Films directed by Craig McCracken
Films scored by James L. Venable
Prequel films
2000s superhero comedy films
Cartoon Network Studios animated films
Rough Draft Studios films
Warner Bros. films
Warner Bros. animated films
Films with screenplays by Paul Rudish
Films with screenplays by Charlie Bean (filmmaker)
Films with screenplays by Lauren Faust
Films with screenplays by Craig McCracken
Films with screenplays by Amy Keating Rogers
American prequel films
Films about children
Apes in popular culture